Rampur is a village in West Champaran district in the Indian state of Bihar.

Demographics
As of 2011 India census, Rampur had a population of 2191 in 380 households. Males constitute 52.53% of the population and females 47.46%. Rampur has an average literacy rate of 45.59%, lower than the national average of 74%: male literacy is 62.86%, and female literacy is 37.13%. In Rampur, 20.3% of the population is under 6 years of age.

See also 
Others places with name Rampur

References

Villages in West Champaran district